Bellamy is a census-designated place and unincorporated community  in Sumter County, Alabama, United States. Its population was 543 as of the 2010 census.

Demographics

As of the 2010 United States Census, there were 543 people living in the CDP. The racial makeup of the CDP was 89.5% Black, 8.3% White and 0.9% Asian. 1.3% were Hispanic or Latino of any race.

References

Census-designated places in Sumter County, Alabama
Census-designated places in Alabama
Unincorporated communities in Alabama
Unincorporated communities in Sumter County, Alabama